The 1991 All-Ireland Junior Hurling Championship was the 70th staging of the All-Ireland Junior Championship since its establishment by the Gaelic Athletic Association in 1912.

Kilkenny entered the championship as the defending champions.

The All-Ireland final was played on 8 September 1991 at the Gaelic Grounds in Limerick, between Tipperary and London, in what was their first meeting in a final since 1933. Tipperary won the match by 4-17 to 1-05 to claim their ninth championship title overall and a first title since 1989.

Results

Leinster Junior Hurling Championship

Leinster quarter-finals

Leinster semi-finals

Leinster final

Munster Junior Hurling Championship

Munster first round

Munster semi-finals

Munster final

Munster final replay

Ulster Junior Hurling Championship

Ulster final

All-Ireland Junior Hurling Championship

All-Ireland semi-finals

All-Ireland home final

All-Ireland final

References

Junior
All-Ireland Junior Hurling Championship